Tikkakoski secondary school is a school in Tikkakoski, Jyväskylä, Finland. The school has about 350 pupils. It was built in 1938 in Suojärvi, but it had to be disbanded the next year because of the Winter War. The school moved to Tikkakoski in 1944 where it remains.

Secondary schools in Finland
Jyväskylä
Buildings and structures in Central Finland